Kinnikinick Lake is located  south of Flagstaff in North Central Arizona within the Coconino National Forest. Prairies of juniper surround the lake and typically abound with pronghorn. Bald eagles are often seen during the fall and winter months. The facilities are maintained under the authority of the Coconino National Forest.

Fish species
 Rainbow Trout
 Catfish (Channel)
 Bullhead
 Brook Trout

References

External links
 Arizona Boating Locations Facilities Map
 Arizona Fishing Locations Map
 Video of Kinnikinick Lake

Lakes of Arizona
Lakes of Coconino County, Arizona
Arizona placenames of Native American origin
Coconino National Forest